The Anatilii were a Gallic tribe dwelling in the Alpilles region during the Iron Age.

Name 
They are mentioned as Anatiliorum by Pliny (1st c. AD).

Their name may be related to Gaulish anatia, meaning 'souls'.

Geography 
Pliny mentions a regio Anatiliorum situated between the Campi lapidei (the Crau) and the territories of Dexivates (between the Durance and Luberon) and Cavari (around present-day Avignon and Cavaillon). Their territory was located north of Libicii and Avatici, east of the Volcae Arecomici. According to historian Guy Barruol, they were part of the Saluvian confederation.

An oppidum with Latin Rights given by Pliny as Anatilia has been linked to the site of Vernègues, near Salon-de-Provence.

References

Bibliography 
 
 

 

Gauls
Tribes of pre-Roman Gaul
Historical Celtic peoples